Radoslav Uzunov (born 25 March 2006) is a Bulgarian footballer who plays as a left-back for Arda Kardzhali.

Career

Arda Kardzhali
Uzunov started his career in Arda Kardzhali Academy at age of 7. In 2019 he moved to Beroe, but just a year after he rejoined Arda. In January 2021, at age of 14, he joined the first team of Arda. On 25 April 2021, at age of 15 years and 1 month, he became the youngest player to debut in the Bulgarian First League, beating the record of Yanko Kirilov from 1961 by one month, coming as a substitute in the 80th minute in the league match against Tsarsko Selo.

Career statistics

Club

References

External links
 

Living people
2006 births
Bulgarian footballers
First Professional Football League (Bulgaria) players
FC Arda Kardzhali players
Association football forwards